Agricultural pollution refers to biotic and abiotic byproducts of farming practices that result in contamination or degradation of the environment and surrounding ecosystems, and/or cause injury to humans and their economic interests. The pollution may come from a variety of sources, ranging from point source water pollution (from a single discharge point) to more diffuse, landscape-level causes, also known as non-point source pollution and air pollution. Once in the environment these pollutants can have both direct effects in surrounding ecosystems, i.e. killing local wildlife or contaminating drinking water, and downstream effects such as dead zones caused by agricultural runoff is concentrated in large water bodies.

Management practices, or ignorance of them, play a crucial role in the amount and impact of these pollutants. Management techniques range from animal management and housing to the spread of pesticides and fertilizers in global agricultural practices, which can have major environmental impacts. Bad management practices include poorly managed animal feeding operations, overgrazing, plowing, fertilizer, and improper, excessive, or badly timed use of pesticides.

Pollutants from agriculture greatly affect water quality and can be found in lakes, rivers, wetlands, estuaries, and groundwater. Pollutants from farming include sediments, nutrients, pathogens, pesticides, metals, and salts. Animal agriculture has an outsized impact on pollutants that enter the environment. Bacteria and pathogens in manure can make their way into streams and groundwater if grazing, storing manure in lagoons and applying manure to fields is not properly managed. Air pollution caused by agriculture through land use changes and animal agriculture practices have an outsized impact on climate change, and addressing these concerns was a central part of the IPCC Special Report on Climate Change and Land. Mitigation of agricultural pollution is a key component in the development of a sustainable food system.

Abiotic sources

Pesticides

Pesticides and herbicides are applied to agricultural land to control pests that disrupt crop production. Soil contamination can occur when pesticides persist and accumulate in soils, which can alter microbial processes, increase plant uptake of the chemical, and are toxic to soil organisms. The extent to which the pesticides and herbicides persist depends on the compound's unique chemistry, which affects sorption dynamics and resulting fate and transport in the soil environment. Pesticides can also accumulate in animals that eat contaminated pests and soil organisms. In addition, pesticides can be more harmful to beneficial insects, such as pollinators, and to natural enemies of pests (i.e. insects that prey on or parasitize pests) than they are to the target pests themselves.

Pesticide leaching
Pesticide leaching occurs when pesticides mix with water and move through the soil, ultimately contaminating groundwater. The amount of leaching is correlated with particular soil and pesticide characteristics and the degree of rainfall and irrigation. Leaching is most likely to happen if using a water-soluble pesticide, when the soil tends to be sandy in texture; if excessive watering occurs just after pesticide application; if the adsorption ability of the pesticide to the soil is low. Leaching may not only originate from treated fields, but also from pesticide mixing areas, pesticide application machinery washing sites, or disposal areas.

Fertilizers 
Fertilizers are used to provide crops with additional sources of nutrients, such as Nitrogen, Phosphorus, and Potassium, that promote plant growth and increase crop yields. While they are beneficial for plant growth, they can also disrupt natural nutrient and mineral biogeochemical cycles and pose risks to human and ecological health.

Nitrogen 
Nitrogen fertilizers supply plants with forms of nitrogen that are biologically available for plant uptake; namely NO3− (nitrate) and NH4+ (ammonium). This increases crop yield and agricultural productivity, but it can also negatively affect groundwater and surface waters, pollute the atmosphere, and degrade soil health. Not all nutrient applied through fertilizer are taken up by the crops, and the remainder accumulates in the soil or is lost as runoff. Nitrate fertilizers are much more likely to be lost to the soil profile through runoff because of its high solubility and like charges between the molecule and negatively charged clay particles. High application rates of nitrogen-containing fertilizers combined with the high water-solubility of nitrate leads to increased runoff into surface water as well as leaching into groundwater, thereby causing groundwater pollution. Nitrate levels above 10 mg/L (10 ppm) in groundwater can cause "blue baby syndrome" (acquired methemoglobinemia) in infants and possibly thyroid disease and various types of cancer. Nitrogen fixation, which coverts atmospheric nitrogen (N2) to more biologically available forms, and denitrification, which converts biologically available nitrogen compounds to N2 and N2O, are two of the most important metabolic processes involved in the nitrogen cycle because they are the largest inputs and outputs of nitrogen to ecosystems. They allow nitrogen to flow between the atmosphere, which is around 78% nitrogen) and the biosphere. Other significant processes in the nitrogen cycle are nitrification and ammonification which covert ammonium to nitrate or nitrite and organic matter to ammonia respectively. Because these processes keep nitrogen concentrations relatively stable in most ecosystems, a large influx of nitrogen from agricultural runoff can cause serious disruption. A common result of this in aquatic ecosystems is eutrophication which in turn creates hypoxic and anoxic conditions - both of which are deadly and/or damaging to many species. Nitrogen fertilization can also release NH3 gases into the atmosphere which can then be converted into NOx compounds. A greater amount of NOx compounds in the atmosphere can result in the acidification of aquatic ecosystems and cause various respiratory issues in humans. Fertilization can also release N2O which is a greenhouse gas and can facilitate the destruction of ozone (O3) in the stratosphere. Soils that receive nitrogen fertilizers can also be damaged. An increase in plant available nitrogen will increase a crop's net primary production, and eventually, soil microbial activity will increase as a result of the larger inputs of nitrogen from fertilizers and carbon compounds through decomposed biomass. Because of the increase in decomposition in the soil, its organic matter content will be depleted which results in lower overall soil health.

Mitigation

Its prioritized measures include use of enhanced-efficiency fertilizers (EEFs), soil amendments, crop legume rotation and application of buffer zones. As a meta-measure, the study proposes "innovative policies such as a nitrogen credit system (NCS) could be implemented to select, incentivize and, where necessary, subsidize the adoption of these measures".

One alternative to standard nitrogen fertilizers are Enhanced Efficiency Fertilizers (EEF). There are several types of EEFs but they generally fall within two categories, slow release fertilizers or nitrification inhibitor fertilizers. Slow release fertilizers are coated in a polymer that delays and slows the release of Nitrogen into agricultural systems. Nitrification inhibitors are fertilizers that are coated in a sulfur compound that is very hydrophobic, this help to slow the release of Nitrogen. EEFs provide a lower and more steady flow of nitrogen into the soil and may reduce nitrogen leaching and volatilization of NOx compounds, however the scientific literature shows both effectiveness and ineffectiveness at reducing nitrogen pollution.

Phosphorus 
The most common form of phosphorus fertilizer used in agricultural practices is phosphate (PO43-), and it is applied in synthetic compounds that incorporate PO43- or in organic forms such as manure and compost. Phosphorus is an essential nutrient in all organisms because of the roles it plays in cell and metabolic functions such as nucleic acid production and metabolic energy transfers. However, most organisms, including agricultural crops, only require a small amount of phosphorus because they have evolved in ecosystems with relatively low amounts of it. Microbial populations in soils are able to convert organic forms of phosphorus to soluble plant available forms such as phosphate. This step is generally bypassed with inorganic fertilizers because it is applied as phosphate or other plant available forms. Any phosphorus that is not taken up by plants is adsorbed to soil particles which helps it remain in place. Because of this, it typically enters surface waters when the soil particles it is attached to are eroded as a result of precipitation or stormwater runoff. The amount that enters surface waters is relatively low in comparison to the amount that is applied as fertilizer, but because it acts as a limiting nutrient in most environments, even a small amount can disrupt an ecosystem's natural phosphorus biogeochemical cycles. Although nitrogen plays a role in harmful algae and cyanobacteria blooms that cause eutrophication, excess phosphorus is considered the largest contributing factor due to the fact that phosphorus is often the most limiting nutrient, especially in freshwaters. In addition to depleting oxygen levels in surface waters, algae and cyanobacteria blooms can produce cyanotoxins which are harmful to human and animal health as well as many aquatic organisms.

The concentration of cadmium in phosphorus-containing fertilizers varies considerably and can be problematic. For example, mono-ammonium phosphate fertilizer may have a cadmium content of as low as 0.14 mg/kg or as high as 50.9 mg/kg. This is because the phosphate rock used in their manufacture can contain as much as 188 mg/kg cadmium (examples are deposits on Nauru and the Christmas islands). Continuous use of high-cadmium fertilizer can contaminate soil and plants. Limits to the cadmium content of phosphate fertilizers has been considered by the European Commission. Producers of phosphorus-containing fertilizers now select phosphate rock based on the cadmium content.
Phosphate rocks contain high levels of fluoride. Consequently, the widespread use of phosphate fertilizers has increased soil fluoride concentrations. It has been found that food contamination from fertilizer is of little concern as plants accumulate little fluoride from the soil; of greater concern is the possibility of fluoride toxicity to livestock that ingest contaminated soils. Also of possible concern are the effects of fluoride on soil microorganisms.
Radioactive elements
The radioactive content of the fertilizers varies considerably and depends both on their concentrations in the parent mineral and on the fertilizer production process. Uranium-238 concentrations range can range from 7 to 100 pCi/g in phosphate rock and from 1 to 67 pCi/g in phosphate fertilizers. Where high annual rates of phosphorus fertilizer are used, this can result in uranium-238 concentrations in soils and drainage waters that are several times greater than are normally present. However, the impact of these increases on the risk to human health from radionuclide contamination of foods is very small (less than 0.05 mSv/y).

Organic contaminants
Manures and biosolids contain many nutrients consumed by animals and humans in the form of food. The practice of returning such waste products to agricultural land presents an opportunity to recycle soil nutrients. The challenge is that manures and biosolids contain not only nutrients such as carbon, nitrogen, and phosphorus, but they may also contain contaminants, including pharmaceuticals and personal care products (PPCPs). There is a wide variety and vast quantity of PPCPs consumed by both humans and animals, and each has unique chemistry in terrestrial and aquatic environments. As such, not all have been assessed for their effects on soil, water, and air quality. The US Environmental Protection Agency (EPA) has surveyed sewage sludge from wastewater treatment plants across the US to assess levels of various PPCPs present.

Metals
The major inputs of heavy metals (e.g. lead, cadmium, arsenic, mercury) into agricultural systems are fertilizers, organic wastes such as manures, and industrial byproduct wastes. Inorganic fertilizers especially represent an important pathway for heavy metals to enter soils. Some farming techniques, such as irrigation, can lead to accumulation of selenium (Se) that occurs naturally in the soil, which can result in downstream water reservoirs containing concentrations of selenium that are toxic to wildlife, livestock, and humans. This process is known as the "Kesterson Effect," eponymously named after the Kesterson Reservoir in the San Joaquin Valley (California, USA), which was declared a toxic waste dump in 1987. Heavy metals present in the environment can be taken up by plants, which can pose health risks to humans in the event of consuming affected plants. Some metals are essential to plant growth, however an abundance can have adverse effects on plant health.

Steel industry wastes, which are often recycled into fertilizers due to their high levels of zinc (essential to plant growth), can also include the following toxic metals: lead, arsenic, cadmium, chromium, and nickel. The most common toxic elements in this type of fertilizer are mercury, lead, and arsenic. These potentially harmful impurities can be removed during fertilizer production; however, this significantly increases cost of fertilizer. Highly pure fertilizers are widely available, and perhaps best known as the highly water-soluble fertilizers containing blue dyes. Fertilizers such as these are commonly used around households, such as Miracle-Gro. These highly water-soluble fertilizers are used in the plant nursery business and are available in larger packages at significantly less cost than retail quantities. There are also some inexpensive retail granular garden fertilizers made with high purity ingredients, limiting production.

Land management

Soil erosion and sedimentation

Agriculture contributes greatly to soil erosion and sediment deposition through intensive management or inefficient land cover. It is estimated that agricultural land degradation is leading to an irreversible decline in fertility on about 6 million ha of fertile land each year. The accumulation of sediments (i.e. sedimentation) in runoff water affects water quality in various ways. Sedimentation can decrease the transport capacity of ditches, streams, rivers, and navigation channels. It can also limit the amount of light penetrating the water, which affects aquatic biota. The resulting turbidity from sedimentation can interfere with feeding habits of fishes, affecting population dynamics. Sedimentation also affects the transport and accumulation of pollutants, including phosphorus and various pesticides.

Tillage and nitrous oxide emissions
Natural soil biogeochemical processes result in the emission of various greenhouse gases, including nitrous oxide. Agricultural management practices can affect emission levels. For example, tillage levels have also been shown to affect nitrous oxide emissions.

Organic farming in mitigation

Biotic sources

Greenhouse gases from fecal waste
The United Nations Food and Agriculture Organization (FAO) predicted that 18% of anthropogenic greenhouse gases come directly or indirectly from the world's livestock. This report also suggested that the emissions from livestock were greater than that of the transportation sector. While livestock do currently play a role in producing greenhouse gas emissions, the estimates have been argued to be a misrepresentation. While the FAO used a life-cycle assessment of animal agriculture (i.e. all aspects including emissions from growing crops for feed, transportation to slaughter, etc.), they did not apply the same assessment for the transportation sector.

Alternate sources  claim that FAO estimates are too low, stating that the global livestock industry could be responsible for up to 51% of emitted atmospheric greenhouse gasses rather than 18%. Critics say the difference in estimates come from the FAO's use of outdated data. Regardless, if the FAO's report of 18% is accurate, that still makes livestock the second-largest greenhouse-gas-polluter.

A PNAS model showed that even if animals were completely removed from U.S. agriculture and diets, U.S. GHG emissions would be decreased by 2.6% only (or 28% of agricultural GHG emissions). This is because of the need replace animal manures by fertilizers and to replace also other animal coproducts, and because livestock now use human-inedible food and fiber processing byproducts. Moreover, people would suffer from a greater number of deficiencies in essential nutrients although they would get a greater excess of energy, possibly leading to greater obesity.

Biopesticides
Biopesticides are pesticides derived from natural materials (animals, plants, microorganisms, certain minerals). As an alternative to traditional pesticides, biopesticides can reduce overall agricultural pollution because they are safe to handle, usually do not strongly affect beneficial invertebrates or vertebrates, and have a short residual time. Some concerns exist that biopesticides may have negative impacts on populations of nontarget species, however.

In the United States, biopesticides are regulated by EPA. Because biopesticides are less harmful and have fewer environmental effects than other pesticides, the agency does not require as much data to register their use. Many biopesticides are permitted under the National Organic Program, United States Department of Agriculture, standards for organic crop production.

Introduced species

Invasive species

The increasing globalization of agriculture has resulted in the accidental transport of pests, weeds, and diseases to novel ranges. If they establish, they become an invasive species that can impact populations of native species and threaten agricultural production. For example, the transport of bumble bees reared in Europe and shipped to the United States and/or Canada for use as commercial pollinators has led to the introduction of an Old World parasite to the New World. This introduction may play a role in recent native bumble bee declines in North America. Agriculturally introduced species can also hybridize with native species resulting in a decline in genetic biodiversity and threaten agricultural production.

Habitat disturbance (ecology) associated with farming practices themselves can also facilitate the establishment of these introduced organisms. Contaminated machinery, livestock and fodder, and contaminated crop or pasture seed can also lead to the spread of weeds.

Quarantines (see biosecurity )are one way in which prevention of the spread of invasive species can be regulated at the policy level. A quarantine is a legal instrument that restricts the movement of infested material from areas where an invasive species is present to areas in which it is absent.
The World Trade Organization has international regulations concerning the quarantine of pests and diseases under the Agreement on the Application of Sanitary and Phytosanitary Measures. Individual countries often have their own quarantine regulations. In the United States, for example, the United States Department of Agriculture/Animal and Plant Health Inspection Service (USDA/APHIS) administers domestic (within the United States) and foreign (importations from outside the United States) quarantines. These quarantines are enforced by inspectors at state borders and ports of entry.

Biological control
The use of biological pest control agents, or using predators, parasitoids, parasites, and pathogens to control agricultural pests, has the potential to reduce agricultural pollution associated with other pest control techniques, such as pesticide use. The merits of introducing non-native biocontrol agents have been widely debated, however. Once released, the introduction of a biocontrol agent can be irreversible. Potential ecological issues could include the dispersal from agricultural habitats into natural environments, and host-switching or adapting to utilize a native species. In addition, predicting the interaction outcomes in complex ecosystems and potential ecological impacts prior to release can be difficult. One example of a biocontrol program that resulted in ecological damage occurred in North America, where a parasitoid of butterflies was introduced to control gypsy moth and browntail moth.  This parasitoid is capable of utilizing many butterfly host species, and likely resulted in the decline and extirpation of several native silk moth species.

International exploration for potential biocontrol agents is aided by agencies such as the European Biological Control Laboratory, the United States Department of Agriculture/Agricultural Research Service (USDA/ARS), the Commonwealth Institute of Biological Control, and the International Organization for Biological Control of Noxious Plants and Animals.  In order to prevent agricultural pollution, quarantine and extensive research on the organism's potential efficacy and ecological impacts are required prior to introduction. If approved, attempts are made to colonize and disperse the biocontrol agent in appropriate agricultural settings. Continual evaluations on their efficacy are conducted.

Genetically modified organisms (GMO)

Genetic contamination and ecological effects
GMO crops can, however, result in genetic contamination of native plant species through hybridization. This could lead to increased weediness of the plant or the extinction of the native species. In addition, the transgenic plant itself may become a weed if the modification improves its fitness in a given environment.

There are also concerns that non-target organisms, such as pollinators and natural enemies, could be poisoned by accidental ingestion of Bt-producing plants. A recent study testing the effects of Bt corn pollen dusting nearby milkweed plants on larval feeding of the monarch butterfly found that the threat to populations of the monarch was low.

The use of GMO crop plants engineered for herbicide resistance can also indirectly increase the amount of agricultural pollution associated with herbicide use. For example, the increased use of herbicide in herbicide-resistant corn fields in the mid-western United States is decreasing the amount of milkweeds available for monarch butterfly larvae.

Regulation of the release of genetic modified organisms vary based on the type of organism and the country concerned.

GMO as a tool of pollution reduction
While there may be some concerns regarding the use of GM products, it may also be the solution to some of the existing animal agriculture pollution issues.  One of the main sources of pollution, particularly vitamin and mineral drift in soils, comes from a lack of digestive efficiency in animals.  By improving digestive efficiency, it is possible to minimize both the cost of animal production and the environmental damage.  One successful example of this technology and its potential application is the Enviropig.

The Enviropig is a genetically modified Yorkshire pig that expresses phytase in its saliva. Grains, such as corn and wheat, have phosphorus that is bound in a naturally indigestible form known as phytic acid. Phosphorus, an essential nutrient for pigs, is then added to the diet, since it can not be broken down in the pigs digestive tract.  As a result, nearly all of the phosphorus naturally found in the grain is wasted in the feces, and can contribute to elevated levels in the soil. Phytase is an enzyme that is able to break down the otherwise indigestible phytic acid, making it available to the pig. The ability of the Enviropig to digest the phosphorus from the grains eliminates the waste of that natural phosphorus (20-60% reduction), while also eliminating the need to supplement the nutrient in feed.

Animal management

Manure management

One of the main contributors to air, soil and water pollution is animal waste. According to a 2005 report by the USDA, more than 335 million tons of "dry matter" waste (the waste after water is removed) is produced annually on farms in the United States. Animal feeding operations produce about 100 times more manure than the amount of human sewage sludge processed in US municipal waste water plants each year. Diffuse source pollution from agricultural fertilizers is more difficult to trace, monitor and control. High nitrate concentrations are found in groundwater and may reach 50 mg/litre (the EU Directive limit). In ditches and river courses, nutrient pollution from fertilizers causes eutrophication. This is worse in winter, after autumn ploughing has released a surge of nitrates; winter rainfall is heavier increasing runoff and leaching, and there is lower plant uptake. EPA suggests that one dairy farm with 2,500 cows produces as much waste as a city with around 411,000 residents. The US National Research Council has identified odors as the most significant animal emission problem at the local level. Different animal systems have adopted several waste management procedures to deal with the large amount of waste produced annually.

The advantages of manure treatment are a reduction in the amount of manure that needs to be transported and applied to crops, as well as reduced soil compaction. Nutrients are reduced as well, meaning that less cropland is needed for manure to be spread upon. Manure treatment can also reduce the risk of human health and biosecurity risks by reducing the amount of pathogens present in manure. Undiluted animal manure or slurry is one hundred times more concentrated than domestic sewage, and can carry an intestinal parasite, Cryptosporidium, which is difficult to detect but can be passed to humans. Silage liquor (from fermented wet grass) is even stronger than slurry, with a low pH and very high biological oxygen demand. With a low pH, silage liquor can be highly corrosive; it can attack synthetic materials, causing damage to storage equipment, and leading to accidental spillage. All of these advantages can be optimized by using the right manure management system on the right farm based on the resources that are available.

Manure treatment

Composting
Composting is a solid manure management system that relies on solid manure from bedded pack pens, or the solids from a liquid manure separator. There are two methods of composting, active and passive. Manure is churned periodically during active composting, whereas in passive composting it is not. Passive composting has been found to have lower green house gas emissions due to incomplete decomposition and lower gas diffusion rates.

Solid-liquid separation
Manure can be mechanically separated into a solid and liquid portion for easier management. Liquids (4-8% dry matter) can be used easily in pump systems for convenient spread over crops and the solid fraction (15-30% dry matter) can be used as stall bedding, spread on crops, composted or exported.

Anaerobic digestion and lagoons

Anaerobic digestion is the biological treatment of liquid animal waste using bacteria in an area absent of air, which promotes the decomposition of organic solids.  Hot water is used to heat the waste in order to increase the rate of biogas production. The remaining liquid is nutrient rich and can be used on fields as a fertilizer and methane gas that can be burned directly on the biogas stove or in an engine generator to produce electricity and heat. Methane is about 20 times more potent as a greenhouse gas than carbon dioxide, which has significant negative environmental effects if not controlled properly.  Anaerobic treatment of waste is the best method for controlling the odor associated with manure management.

Biological treatment lagoons also use anaerobic digestion to break down solids, but at a much slower rate.  Lagoons are kept at ambient temperatures as opposed to the heated digestion tanks.  Lagoons require large land areas and high dilution volumes to work properly, so they do not work well in many climates in the northern United States. Lagoons also offer the benefit of reduced odor and biogas is made available for heat and electric power.

Studies have demonstrated that GHG emissions are reduced using aerobic digestion systems. GHG emission reductions and credits can help compensate for the higher installation cost of cleaner aerobic technologies and facilitate producer adoption of environmentally superior technologies to replace current anaerobic lagoons.

See also

Environmental impact of agriculture
Agroecology
Agricultural nutrient runoff
Agricultural surface runoff
Agricultural wastewater
Bioeconomy
Genetically modified food controversies
Nutrient management
Pest control
Pesticide#Alternatives
Tillage

References 
 

Air pollution
Soil
Water pollution